Lyubomyrivka, known as Krasne Znamia until 2016, is a rural settlement (a selyshche) in Mykolaiv Raion, Mykolaiv Oblast (province) of Ukraine. It belongs to Shevchenkove rural hromada, one of the hromadas of Ukraine.

Until 18 July 2020, Lyubomyrivka was located in Snihurivka Raion. The raion was abolished in July 2020 as part of the administrative reform of Ukraine, which reduced the number of raions of Mykolaiv Oblast to four. The area of Snihurivka Raion was merged into Bashtanka Raion, however, Lyubomyrivka was transferred to Mykolaiv Raion.

References 

Rural settlements in Mykolaiv Oblast